Muddy Creek is a stream in the U.S. state of Iowa. It is a tributary to the Iowa River.

Muddy Creek was so named due to the muddy character of its waters.

References

Rivers of Johnson County, Iowa
Rivers of Iowa